The Sports Broadcasting Act of 1961 affects Title 15 of the United States Code, Chapter 32 "Telecasting of Professional Sports Contest" (§§ 1291-1295)

Overview
The Sports Broadcasting Act was passed in response to a court decision which ruled that the National Football League's method of negotiating television broadcasting rights violated antitrust laws. The court ruled that the "pooling" of rights by all the teams to conclude an exclusive contract between the league and CBS was illegal.

The Act overrules that decision, and permits certain joint broadcasting agreements among the major professional sports. It recognizes the fact that the various franchises in a sports league, while competitors in the sporting sense, are not as much business competitors as they are interdependent partners, whose success as enterprises is intertwined, as a certain level of competitive balance between them must exist for any of them to remain viable enterprises. Therefore, it permits the sale of a television "package" to a network or networks in which the league members share equally, a procedure which is common today. Of the four major North American professional team sports, the Act is most pertinent to the NFL, as all of its regular-season and playoff games are broadcast via the rights assigned to the networks via national broadcast rights packages, as opposed to local team broadcast rights as found in the other leagues.

The law has been interpreted to include the so-called "blackout rules" which protect a home team from competing games broadcast into its home territory on a day when it is playing a game at home, and from being required to broadcast games within its home market area that have not sold out, though none of the leagues implement such rules any longer. 

It also, in effect, protects high school football and college football game attendance by blacking out pro football games locally on Friday evenings and Saturdays during those sports' regular seasons; these measures effectively outlawed the broadcasting (and, in practice, the playing) of NFL games on those days, since virtually all of the country is within 75 miles (120 km) of at least one high school game on every Friday night in September and October.

Exceptions
This portion of the act has since been partially circumvented; the NFL extended its season in 1978 to allow a few weeks of Friday night or Saturday games if the league so wished. Late-season Saturday games have been common since then, but Friday night games are still extremely rare; the league has played only eight Friday games since 1978, mostly because of the NFL's restrictions during Christmas. In 2005, a Miami Dolphins-Kansas City Chiefs matchup, scheduled for Sunday, October 23 in Miami, was moved up to 7pm Friday night due to Hurricane Wilma. The game was televised only within 75 miles of Miami and Kansas City.

College football
The National Collegiate Athletic Association (NCAA)'s broadcast packages are not subject to the antitrust exemption and it suffered for it, when the Supreme Court ruled that the NCAA's restrictive television policies were a violation of antitrust law in the 1980s when the University of Georgia and the University of Oklahoma sued the NCAA over television restrictions (limit of six television appearances over two years) established in 1952. However, after their court victory, neither Georgia nor Oklahoma made serious efforts to market their own television packages, but instead followed the lead of their conferences, the Southeastern Conference and the Big 8 Conference respectively.

The College Football Association, an alliance of 64 schools from some of the major conferences and selected independents, sold their own television package in 1984, first to ABC, and later to CBS. The Big Ten and Pac-10 conferences, not CFA affiliates, sold their own separate package, first to CBS in 1984, and to ABC in 1987.

By 1991, the landscape changed. ABC had the CFA, Big Ten, and Pac-10 packages, and NBC the Notre Dame home package. It was once again relegated to limited appearances.

The CFA collapsed, and in 1995, the Southeastern Conference signed a national deal with CBS. They are the only major conference guaranteed a national "game of the week" because ESPN's games may come from any of the conferences they offer.

References

1961 in American law
87th United States Congress
Sports law
Broadcast law
United States federal communications legislation
United States federal antitrust legislation
United States federal legislation articles without infoboxes
National Football League on television
College football on television
Major League Baseball on television